The 2016 Miami FC season is the club's first season of existence. The club plays in the North American Soccer League, the second tier of the American soccer pyramid.

Roster

Staff
  Mauro Pederzoli – Technical Director
  Alessandro Nesta – Head Coach
  Lorenzo Rubinacci – Assistant coach
  Vincenzo Benvenuto – Goalkeeper coach
  Paolo Pacione – Head of Performance and Fitness Coach

Transfers

Winter

In:

Out:

Summer

In:

Out:

Friendlies

Competitions

NASL Spring season

Standings

Results summary

Results by round

Matches

NASL Fall season

Standings

Results summary

Results by round

Matches

U.S. Open Cup

Squad statistics

Appearances and goals

|-
|colspan="14"|Players who left Miami FC during the season:

|}

Goal scorers

Disciplinary record

References

External links
 

Miami FC seasons
American soccer clubs 2016 season
2016 in sports in Florida
2016 North American Soccer League season